Aerial Assist was the 2014 FIRST Robotics Competition game.

Kickoff
The Kickoff event was held on January 4, 2014. Speakers included Dean Kamen and Woodie Flowers. It was broadcast on NASA TV beginning at 10:30 EST.

Rules

In the game, the alliances win via getting the scoring elements (2'-diameter exercise balls) into the scoring areas located on the far end of the field. 
The game starts with each robots in either the White Zone (center field) or the goalie zones. They can be preloaded with 1 game ball prior to the start. The match begins with a 10-second autonomous period, where robots use the pre-programmed instructions to score points. Said points are worth 5 more during the Autonomous period, and one goal will be lit up ("hot") during each half. That goal is worth 5 additional points, for a maximum total of a 10-point bonus. In addition, every robot that moves from the center to their own side of the field earns another five point bonus. 
When Tele-op starts, the teams take control of their respective robots. The cycle starts when a human player transfers a ball onto the playing field. The robots can then do either the basic goal score (take the ball to the other end of the field), or assist them in doing so. The recipient of the latter will earn bonus points (2 assists=10 points, 3 assists=30 points). Throwing the ball over the truss (the midpoint overhang) when transferring, a la volleyball, will add 10 additional points. Having an alliance partner catch it will earn 10 more points. A robot in the goalie zones can block shots via extending upwards.

Events

Regionals

Week 1

Week 2

Week 3

Week 4

Week 5

Week 6

Week 7

Districts

State/Regional Championships

World Championship

Final Round at Einstein Field
Source:

References

External links
Official game animation

FIRST Robotics Competition games
2014 in robotics